Lieutenant Fitz Henry Babbitt (10 October 1790 – 15 January 1815) was an officer of the United States Navy who served during the War of 1812, and was killed during the capture of USS President.

Biography
Babbitt was probably born in Brookfield, Massachusetts, and was appointed a midshipman in the Navy on 2 April 1804. He accepted his warrant on 28 May 1804 and entered into service on board the 32-gun frigate , that same day. He served in Essex and in the bomb ketch  in the Mediterranean Sea between 1804 and 1806. He was appointed an acting lieutenant and ordered to the brig  on 1 February 1810. He cruised the waters along the east coast of the United States in Argus until late October, at which time he was furloughed. Babbitt received his lieutenant's commission on 4 March 1811, with seniority to date from 5 June 1810.

On 19 February 1812, he received orders to join  and served in her until 17 July 1812 when a British squadron – built around the 64-gun ship-of-the-line  and the frigates  and  – captured Nautilus off the northern New Jersey coast. Babbitt spent several weeks as a prisoner of war in Halifax, Nova Scotia, before being exchanged. Following his return, he was assigned to the frigate  on 30 November 1812 and helped in the futile effort to get that ship ready for sea after her modification into a sloop of war. Though the work was completed by the end of 1812, the British had Adams blockaded in Chesapeake Bay by then, and she remained so until early in 1814. Babbitt's assignment to Adams, however, lasted only until the spring of 1813. On 6 April 1813, he received orders to join the frigate ; but those orders were apparently changed later in the month, and he went to Sackett's Harbor along with the officers and men of the blockaded Adams. In September 1813, Babbitt again received orders to United States to serve as that ship's first lieutenant. United States, however, languished at New London – along with her recent prize, by then also in American service, and the sloop of war  – under a blockade imposed by a powerful British squadron.

In the spring of 1814, the frigate's commanding officer, Captain Stephen Decatur, received a posting to command the 44-gun frigate , and took the crew of United States with him to man his new command. Thus, Babbitt came to be Presidents first lieutenant. Once again, Babbitt found himself assigned to a warship unable to get to sea because of a strong blockade. The frigate remained hemmed in at New York for the rest of 1814. Not until January 1815 did conditions allow President to attempt her escape to sea. Though the peace treaty had been signed in Ghent, Belgium, in December 1814, word had not reached the Americas, and hostilities continued in the western hemisphere for some weeks. Thus, when President made her move for the open sea, British warships stood ready to engage her.

During the ensuing fight, President managed to inflict sufficient damage on HMS Endymion to force her out of the struggle, but the unequal contest exacted a greater toll from the American ship. Unable to outrun her other adversaries because of hull damage sustained during a grounding soon after sailing, President finally succumbed to the combined attention of the three remaining British ships after a six-hour exchange in which she lost 24 of her crewmen and three of her lieutenants, including Babbitt.

Namesake
The destroyer  (1919–1946) was named for him.

References
 

1790 births
1815 deaths
United States Navy officers
United States Navy personnel of the War of 1812
American military personnel killed in the War of 1812